The Chapel of the Madeleine, formerly the Priory of the Madeleine or Malestroit Priory (Prieuré de la Madeleine de Malestroit), is a ruined chapel in Malestroit in the department of Morbihan, Brittany, France.

History and description 

The ruins, which are mediaeval with some 17th-century additions, are of an ancient leper hospital, which became in 1129 a priory of Marmoutier Abbey. In 1343, the plenipotentiaries of Philip VI of Valois and Edward III of England signed the Truce of Malestroit here. 

The chapel was the scene of battle in January 1795 (Nivôse An III) when a group of Chouans were massacred inside its walls. The violence of the fighting is illustrated in the painting by Alexandre Bloch.

The chapel became disused in 1870. Its  stained glass windows, depicting the story of Mary Magdalene, were bought by Emile Zola and later sold to an American museum. The bell-gable with fortified steeple is reputedly the oldest in the department.

The ruins of the chapel were registered as an historical monument in December 1934.

References

External links 

 TOPIC TOPOS : Chapelle Sainte-Madeleine, Malestroit
 Emile Sageret, 1911: Le Morbihan et la chouannerie morbihannaise sous le Consulat (Gallica.bnf.fr: online version)

Churches in Morbihan
Monuments historiques of Morbihan